In algebraic geometry, the minimal model program is part of the birational classification of algebraic varieties. Its goal is to construct a birational model of any complex projective variety which is as simple as possible. The subject has its origins in the classical birational geometry of surfaces studied by the Italian school, and is currently an active research area within algebraic geometry.

Outline
The basic idea of the theory is to simplify the birational classification of varieties by finding, in each birational equivalence class, a variety which is "as simple as possible". The precise meaning of this phrase has evolved with the development of the subject; originally for surfaces, it meant finding a smooth variety  for which any birational morphism  with a smooth surface  is an isomorphism.

In the modern formulation, the goal of the theory is as follows. Suppose we are given a projective variety , which for simplicity is assumed non-singular. There are two cases based on its Kodaira dimension, :

Such a morphism is called a Fano fibre space.

The question of whether the varieties  and  appearing above are non-singular is an important one. It seems natural to hope that if we start with smooth , then we can always find a minimal model or Fano fibre space inside the category of smooth varieties. However, this is not true, and so it becomes necessary to consider singular varieties also. The singularities that appear are called terminal singularities.

Minimal models of surfaces

Every irreducible complex algebraic curve is birational to a unique smooth projective curve, so the theory for curves is trivial. The case of surfaces was first investigated by the geometers of the Italian school around 1900; the contraction theorem of Guido Castelnuovo essentially describes the process of constructing a minimal model of any surface. The theorem states that any nontrivial birational morphism  must contract a −1-curve to a smooth point, and conversely any such curve can be smoothly contracted. Here a −1-curve is a smooth rational curve C with self-intersection  Any such curve must have  which shows that if the canonical class is nef then the surface has no −1-curves.

Castelnuovo's theorem implies that to construct a minimal model for a smooth surface, we simply contract all the −1-curves on the surface, and the resulting variety Y is either a (unique) minimal model with K nef, or a ruled surface (which is the same as a 2-dimensional Fano fiber space, and is either a projective plane or a ruled surface over a curve). In the second case, the ruled surface birational to X is not unique, though there is a unique one isomorphic to the product of the projective line and a curve. A somewhat subtle point is that even though a surface might have infinitely many -1-curves, one need only contract finitely many of them to obtain a surface with no -1-curves.

Higher-dimensional minimal models
In dimensions greater than 2, the theory becomes far more involved. In particular, there exist smooth varieties  which are not birational to any smooth variety  with nef canonical class. The major conceptual advance of the 1970s and early 1980s was that the construction of minimal models is still feasible, provided one is careful about the types of singularities which occur. (For example, we want to decide if  is nef, so intersection numbers  must be defined. Hence, at the very least, our varieties must have  to be a Cartier divisor for some positive integer .)

However, the process may encounter difficulties: at some point the variety  may become "too singular". It is not clear that the required flips exist, nor that they always terminate (that is, that one reaches a minimal model  in finitely many steps.)  showed that flips exist in the 3-dimensional case.

The existence of the more general log flips was established by Vyacheslav Shokurov in dimensions three and four. This was subsequently generalized to higher dimensions by Caucher Birkar, Paolo Cascini, Christopher Hacon, and James McKernan relying on earlier work of Shokurov and Hacon, and McKernan. They also proved several other problems including finite generation of log canonical rings and existence of minimal models for varieties of log general type.

The problem of termination of log flips in higher dimensions remains the subject of active research.

See also
Abundance conjecture
Minimal rational surface

References

Algebraic geometry
Birational geometry
3-folds